Kyoji Suga (born 11 May 1969) is a Japanese biathlete. He competed at the 1998 Winter Olympics, the 2002 Winter Olympics and the 2006 Winter Olympics.

References

1969 births
Living people
Japanese male biathletes
Olympic biathletes of Japan
Biathletes at the 1998 Winter Olympics
Biathletes at the 2002 Winter Olympics
Biathletes at the 2006 Winter Olympics
Sportspeople from Hokkaido
Asian Games medalists in biathlon
Biathletes at the 2003 Asian Winter Games
Asian Games gold medalists for Japan
Asian Games bronze medalists for Japan
Medalists at the 2003 Asian Winter Games